The Ocean Freedom is a multi-purpose dry cargo ship, commissioned in 2010.

She was damaged in a collision with a barge in the Port of Corpus Christi, Texas, on October 29, 2015.  Damage totalled $750,000.

She carried two former United States Coast Guard cutters to Odessa, to serve in the Ukrainian Navy, in October 2019.

References

External links

Cargo ships of the United States